Villa Beau-Site or Maison Nelissen (Nelissen House) is an Art Nouveau building in the municipality of Forest in Brussels, Belgium.

It was built in 1905 as the private residence of Dutch-born architect  and his wife, soon after their wedding. It was classified as a protected heritage site in 2006.

The façade of the building is unusually narrow, under , but richly decorated. The ground floor, in sinuous Art Nouveau style, has an asymmetrical layout and is in blue stone and with details in original elaborately wrought iron. The first floor is dominated by a large horseshoe arch  which perforates the façade, giving way to a small loggia. Behind the loggia, another horseshoe arch frames the  window opening to the loggia. The top floor contains a small wrought-iron balcony, and the very top of the façade is decorated with a bas-relief depicting a vase of flowers. The material used for the façade is mainly brick; white bricks cover most of the surface but green bricks and blue stone has been used to highlight the arch and other features of the façade. In 1920, decoration in the form of stylised roses were added between the first and second floor.

Inside, the building preserves its original floor plan. It forms part of a row of homogenous townhouses, built 1904–1910 in eclectic styles, overlooking Forest Park.

The building bears certain similarities with Saint-Cyr House by Gustave Strauven, also in Brussels. The official list of architectural heritage of Brussels describes the facade of the building as "remarkable" and art historian Cécile Dubois has described the building as "a stunning architectural gem".

See also
 Art Nouveau in Brussels

References

External links
 

Houses in Belgium
Art Nouveau architecture in Brussels
Houses completed in 1905
Forest, Belgium